One of the major facilities built in the Manila campus of Pontifical and Royal University of Santo Tomas, the Buenaventura Garcia Paredes, O.P. Building, colloquially known as BGPOP, is poised to serve as the meeting place of all members of the alumni in the Philippines and abroad. The building houses the current Senior High School students of the University. In addition, the center is conceived to house the individual alumni chapters of each faculty and college. The structure honors the name of Blessed Buenaventura García de Paredes, who was a law professor of the University and a Master of the Order of Preachers martyred in 1936 during the religious persecution in Spain.

The site is the current location of UST's original gymnasium, which was the largest in the Philippines when it was built. Given its historic importance to UST, the gym's front and rear façade are kept and the entrance of the alumni center is along Tamayo Drive. The adjacent Olympic-sized swimming pool has remained, yet refurbished.

Visit of UST Rector in the United States 
In June 2010, Fr. Rolando dela Rosa, O.P. visited the Thomasian Alumni based in the United States. He addressed the members of the alumni in the U.S. particularly the Thomasian medical practitioners to invite them to come home and join the festivities for UST's quadricentennial anniversary. This happened during the 18th Annual Grand Reunion and Medical Convention of the UST Medical Alumni Association in America or USTMAAA. During the event, the UST Rector acknowledged the association's pledge of US$1 million for the construction of the Thomasian Alumni Center.

Construction 
The demolition of the original UST gymnasium started on April 6, 2011. The construction of the alumni center will commence once the original gymnasium had been demolished.

Facilities 
The alumni center will have twelve floors and a mezzanine. The ground floor will feature a grand lobby to serve as the center's main converging point. A souvenir shop, business center, coffee shop, and travel bureau will all be located on this floor. There will also be a mezzanine where the Thomasian Honor Gallery will be placed. The center's grand ballroom will be located on the second floor for homecoming and other events. The third floor will be the location of the Office for Alumni Affairs and the offices of each faculty/college-based alumni associations. There will also be meeting rooms on this floor. The fourth floor will feature function rooms for smaller events and seminars. Lastly, the fifth floor will have hostel facilities for accommodation services for traveling and returning alumni. This floor will also have a spa and wellness center.

See also
 List of University of Santo Tomas buildings

References 

University of Santo Tomas
Educational structures in Metro Manila
Buildings and structures in Sampaloc, Manila